State Road 245 in the U.S. state of Indiana is a two-lane north–south highway in that runs entirely within Spencer County in the southwest corner of the state.

Route description
State Road 245 begins at State Road 70 east of Newtonville and runs north.  Passing through Santa Claus, it is concurrent with State Road 162 and serves the Holiday World & Splashin' Safari theme park.  Past the park, the concurrent routes run along Christmas Boulevard, while the northern stretch of State Road 245 that leads northwest out of town toward Dale is called Holiday Boulevard.  State Road 245 ends at State Road 62 east of Dale.

History
Until March 2001, State Road 245 was concurrent with State Road 70 west through Newtonville, then south to State Road 66 northeast of Grandview.  This segment of highway was decommissioned by the state and is now a county road.

Major intersections

References

External links

 Indiana Highway Ends - SR 245

245
Transportation in Spencer County, Indiana